Actinokentia is a genus of flowering plants in the family Arecaceae, comprising two species, both indigenous to New Caledonia. Relationships between Actinokentia and the other genera of subtribe Archontophoenicinae, including the Australian Archontophoenix and the New Caledonia endemic Chambeyronia and Kentiopsis are unresolved.

References

Archontophoenicinae
Arecaceae genera
Flora of New Caledonia
Taxonomy articles created by Polbot